"Town" is a song by Northern Uproar, released from their album Northern Uproar. It reached number 48 on the UK Singles Chart in 1996.

Track listing
"Town"
"Memories"
"Kicks"
"I Am The Cosmos"

References

1996 singles
Northern Uproar songs
1996 songs
Song articles with missing songwriters